Chilo mercatorius is a moth in the family Crambidae. It was described by Stanisław Błeszyński in 1970. It is found in the Democratic Republic of the Congo.

References

Chiloini
Moths described in 1970